Limbrick is a surname. Notable people with the surname include:

 Anthony Limbrick (born 1983), Australian football coach
 David Limbrick, Australian politician
 Garrett Limbrick (born 1965), American football player
 Warren Limbrick, New Zealand Anglican dean

See also
 Limbric, type of cloth
 Limbrick, Lancashire, hamlet